Strahinja Krstevski (born 8 June 1997) is a Macedonian footballer who plays as a forward.

Club career

Early years
Born in Novi Sad, Krstevski passed Vojvodina youth school, where he spent 10 years between 2006 and 2016. Playing for youth categories of the club from his home town, Krstevski made more than 150 caps and scored over 100 goals. He also played some tournaments for youth players with Vojvodina and Buriram United, where he appeared as a loaned player for some period in 2016. As a captain of U19 squad, Strahinja made his debut for senior team at the friendly match against Hajduk Beška in spring 2016. In summer of the same year, he signed a three-year professional contract with club, which terminated shortly after and moved to Proleter Novi Sad.

Proleter Novi Sad
Krstevski signed one-year professional contract with Proleter Novi Sad at the beginning of August 2016. He made his senior debut in the first fixture of the 2016–17 Serbian First League season, in away match against Dinamo Vranje, played on 14 August 2016, when he also scored a goal. In the next fixture match, Krstevski scored 2 goals for win against Bežanija, and was nominated for player of the fixture. On 21 September 2016, Krstevski made an appearance in the first round of Serbian Cup, against Javor Ivanjica. He also scored a goal in a match against Jagodina until the end of first half-season. After he missed a period at the beginning of New year due to injury, Krstevski fully recovered in April 2017. He scored 2 goals in 4–1 home victory against Kolubara. In summer 2017, Krstevski moved on six-month loan to Vojvodina League South club Borac Šajkaš. Returning to the first squad of Proleter, manager Nenad Vanić usually used him as a back-up choice. Krstevski scored his first goal in the 2017–18 Serbian First League campaign in 3–0 victory over Dinamo Vranje on 11 April 2018. He also scored in 3–1 away victory over Radnički Kragujevac, after which Proleter made promotion to the Serbian SuperLiga. On 22 July 2018, Krstevski scored in opening fixture match of the 2018–19 Serbian SuperLiga campaign, against Radnički Niš.

Career statistics

Club

References

External links
 
 
 

1997 births
Living people
Footballers from Novi Sad
Macedonian people of Serbian descent
Association football forwards
Serbian footballers
Macedonian footballers
Serbia youth international footballers
North Macedonia youth international footballers
FK Vojvodina players
FK Proleter Novi Sad players
FC Lokomotiv 1929 Sofia players
RFK Grafičar Beograd players
FK Rabotnički players
FC Samtredia players
FCI Levadia Tallinn players
Serbian First League players
Serbian SuperLiga players
Second Professional Football League (Bulgaria) players
Macedonian First Football League players
Macedonian expatriate footballers
Expatriate footballers in Bulgaria
Expatriate footballers in Georgia (country)
Expatriate footballers in Estonia
Macedonian expatriate sportspeople in Bulgaria
Macedonian expatriate sportspeople in Georgia (country)
Macedonian expatriate sportspeople in Estonia
Meistriliiga players